The Second Philp Ministry was the 24th ministry of the Government of Queensland and was led by Premier Robert Philp, who led the Conservative party. It succeeded the Second Kidston Ministry on 19 November 1907 following Kidston's resignation on 12 November 1907. The Ministry lost a vote of no-confidence in the Legislative Assembly by 37 to 29 on its first day, and Philp asked for and obtained a dissolution of Parliament. At the 5 February 1908 election, the Conservative party lost seven Assembly seats including those of two of the ministers (Leahy and Stephens), and on 14 February Philp resigned. The Ministry formally concluded on 18 February 1908, and was succeeded by the Second Kidston Ministry.

The Ministry
On 19 November 1907, the Governor, Lord Chelmsford, designated eight principal executive offices of the Government, and appointed the following Members of the Parliament of Queensland to the Ministry as follows:

 The Minister of Justice fulfilled all duties usually performed by the Attorney-General.

References
 
 
 

Queensland ministries